is an autobiography by George Sand covering her life up to shortly before the Revolution of 1848. The autobiography was published in Paris in 1854 and 1855 by Victor Lecou.

George Sand had planned as early as 1835, shortly after the end of her relationship with Alfred de Musset, to write her memoirs. She started in April 1847 and, with many interruptions for other work, finished her memoirs in 1855. In the autobiography the dates and the succession of events are not entirely veracious. The work consists largely of extensive rewriting of letters that she sent and received.  is a literary masterpiece with value as a social document and a family history.

The 1856 edition published in Paris by Michel Lévy Frères consists of 5 separate books with a total of 13 chapters.  is organized into 5 parts:
 ;
  (1800–1811);
  (1810–1819);
  (1819–1832);
 .

Gallimard published in 1970 an edition which was edited by Georges Lubin and then translated into English by a team of translators led by Thelma Jurgrau. The translation was published by State University of New York Press in 1991 with the title Story of My Life: The Autobiography of George Sand.

References

1850s books
Autobiographies
French autobiographies
Literary autobiographies
French-language books